The 1932 United States presidential election in Maryland took place on November 8, 1932, as part of the 1932 United States presidential election. State voters chose eight representatives, or electors, to the Electoral College, who voted for president and vice president.

Maryland was won by Governor Franklin D. Roosevelt (D–New York), running with Speaker John Nance Garner, with 61.50% of the popular vote, against incumbent President Herbert Hoover (R–California), running with Vice President Charles Curtis, with 36.04% of the popular vote.

Until 2020, this was the last time the Democratic candidate won over 65% of the vote in Howard County. As of 2020, this is also the last time the Republican candidate failed to win a single county on the Eastern Shore.

Results

Results by county

Counties that flipped from Republican to Democratic
Anne Arundel
Baltimore (City)
Baltimore (County)
Caroline
Carroll
Cecil
Charles
Dorchester
Frederick
Harford
Howard
Kent
Montgomery
Prince George's
Somerset
Talbot
Washington
Wicomico
Worcester

See also
 United States presidential elections in Maryland
 1932 United States presidential election
 1932 United States elections

Notes

References 

Maryland
1932
Presidential